Uncu (Unku) was a men's garment of the Inca Empire. It was an upper-body garment of knee-length; Royals wore it with a mantle cloth called ''yacolla.'' Women wore a long dress known as an anaku.

Structure 
Uncu was similar to a long tunic, ranging between 84 and 100 cms, with a 72-79 cms width range. However, the length of the highland and coastal garments was different; Uncu in the highland were sleeveless and longer than the coastal tunic. Kings, nobles, and ordinary people all wore Uncu. The design and motifs for these dresses were rank-, cultural-, and event-specific. For example, capac uncu was a rich, powerful shirt worn by Inca Roca (the king). Inca royals clothing consisted of ''tocapu'' an art of geometric figures enclosed by rectangles or squares.

Each garment was woven individually.

Material 
Ordinary Uncu was made from cotton blending with various camelidae fibres such as llama, alpaca, guanaco, and vicuña, but for royal use, a whole finest cloth (cumbi) was used.

Gallery

References 

Clothing
Inca culture
Indigenous textile art of the Americas